Chopaka Lake is a lake in Okanogan County, Washington. The lake's name is that of a legendary Okanogan hunter who was transformed to stone by Coyote. It serves as an irrigation reservoir for local ranchers. Chopaka Lake is a favorite among fly fishers who cast for rainbow trout.

See also
Chopaka, British Columbia
Mount Chopaka

References

External links
Chopaka Lake pictographs
Chopaka Lake fly-fishing report
Chopaka Lake page, Bureau of Land Management

Lakes of Washington (state)
Lakes of Okanogan County, Washington
Protected areas of Okanogan County, Washington
Bureau of Land Management areas in Washington (state)